Safana is a Local Government Area in Katsina State, Nigeria. Its headquarters are in the town of Safana in the east of the area at. The western border of the area is shared with Zamfara State. 
AND HAS TWO DISTRICT HEAD yariman katsina and gatarin katsina
It has an area of 282 km and a population of 183,779 at the 2006 census.

The postal code of the area is 821.

References

Local Government Areas in Katsina State